Guy Debbaudt (born 18 May 1936) is a Belgian former field hockey player. He competed in the men's tournament at the 1960 Summer Olympics.

References

External links
 

1936 births
Living people
Belgian male field hockey players
Olympic field hockey players of Belgium
Field hockey players at the 1960 Summer Olympics
People from Woluwe-Saint-Pierre
Field hockey players from Brussels